Stewardson is a village in Shelby County, Illinois, United States. The population was 734 at the 2010 census.

Geography
Stewardson is located at  (39.263186, -88.628964).

Demographics

As of the census of 2000, there were 747 people, 305 households, and 204 families residing in the village. The racial makeup of the village was 99.33% White, 0.13% Native American, 0.13% Asian, and 0.40% from two or more races.

There were 305 households, out of which 32.5% had children under the age of 18 living with them, 52.8% were married couples living together, 10.8% had a female householder with no husband present, and 33.1% were non-families. 30.5% of all households were made up of individuals, and 18.7% had someone living alone who was 65 years of age or older. The average household size was 2.45 and the average family size was 3.08.

In the village, the population was spread out, with 25.3% under the age of 18, 11.0% from 18 to 24, 24.2% from 25 to 44, 21.7% from 45 to 64, and 17.8% who were 65 years of age or older. The median age was 37 years. For every 100 females, there were 96.1 males. For every 100 females age 18 and over, there were 84.8 males.

The median income for a household in the village was $31,923, and the median income for a family was $42,000. Males had a median income of $27,981 versus $20,125 for females. The per capita income for the village was $15,586. About 10.3% of families and 11.6% of the population were below the poverty line, including 17.4% of those under age 18 and 9.5% of those age 65 or over. Stewardson's website address is http://www.stewardsonil.com

References

Villages in Shelby County, Illinois
Villages in Illinois